The Makatote River is a river of the centre of New Zealand's North Island. It flows west from the slopes of Mount Ruapehu, and from the Hauhungatahi Wilderness Area, before entering rough hill country, veering southwest and entering a gorge cut almost  into the volcanic rocks. It joins with the waters of several smaller streams to become the Manganui o te Ao River, part of the Whanganui River system.

The river is part of a water conservation order catchment to protect indigenous fish including lamprey, longfinned eel, short-finned eel, common smelt, banded kokopu, short-jawed kokopu, koaro, torrentfish, redfinned bully, common bully, and Cran's bully. Trees in the gorge include rimu, matai and maire. The main trees logged were rimu, matai, kahikatea, totara and miro. The lowest  of the river is monitored for its whio population. A proposal to create a track to Te Kohatu waterfall was rejected as being inappropriate for a wilderness area.

SH4 (originally built by the railway for access to its construction sites) crosses on a much lower bridge near the viaduct.

Just to the north of the viaduct, the Makatote Tramway has a Category 2 listing by the New Zealand Historic Places Trust, with remnants of rails, skid sites, a log hauler, water pits and bogie wheels. In the 1930s Western Red Cedar and Lawson's Cypress were planted near the tramway by the State Forests Service as part of a wider experimental high-altitude planting programme. Japanese Cedar, Douglas Fir, Ponderous Pine, Weymouth Pine and Sugar Pine were also considered for the experiment.

See also
List of rivers of New Zealand

References

External links 
 Te Kohatu waterfall in 1908 - location on 1:50,000 map, on Panoramio, tramping route description
 Tramway photos on Facebook, map of tramway

Rivers of Manawatū-Whanganui
Rivers of New Zealand